The fourth season of Pilipinas Got Talent is a talent show on ABS-CBN. The show premiered on February 16, 2013. Billy Crawford, and Luis Manzano reprised their hosting duties; while Kris Aquino, Ai-Ai delas Alas, and Freddie Garcia returned as judges of the show.

This season will mark the introduction of a semifinal round, where in 12 acts who won the quarterfinals will compete for the six slots in the grand finals.

On June 2, 2013, Roel Manlangit, a 13-year-old singer from Valencia, Bukidnon, was hailed as the winner of the season.

A special episode, dubbed as You Got It! Kwento Natin 'To!, highlighting the past episodes of the season was aired on June 8, 2013.

Auditions

A teaser for the fourth season were aired after the results night of The X Factor Philippines on July 29, 2012. Calls for auditions were announced in early August 2012. Major auditions were held in key cities like Parañaque, Quezon City, Dagupan, Bacolod, General Santos, Cebu and Davao City. Mini-auditions were also held in Manila, Marikina, Valenzuela City, Nueva Ecija, Olongapo, Taytay, Dasmariñas, Rosario, Santa Rosa City, San Pablo City, Batangas City, Lipa City, Lucena City, Gumaca, Calapan, Palawan, Iloilo, Consolacion, Dumaguete, Tacloban and Cagayan de Oro.

People were also able to audition online by uploading their audition videos to CgeTV, a user-generated video channel created by ABS-CBN Interactive. Online auditions ran from August 2012 until December 30, 2012. In addition, there are outdoor auditions for some acts in the show such as exhibitions, stunts and gymnastics that required materials like cars, motorcycles or swimming pool which held outside the venue.

Winners of TFCkat, an international competition made by The Filipino Channel which is held in Filipino key areas all over the world, were also given auditions slots.

Successful auditionees
At the end of the auditions, all the artists who made it through the auditions will proceed to the "Judges Cull".

Judges Cull
After the auditions, 104 acts made it to the Judges Cull held at the ABS-CBN Broadcasting Center in Quezon City. In this round, the judges will make a review of their auditions in order to choose the top 36 acts to compete in the Live Quarterfinals. The quarter finalists are composed of fourteen dance acts; seven singing acts; three musical acts; and twelve variety/novelty acts that include various stunts, outdoor acts, magic acts, acrobatics and gymnastics.

Top 36 results summary
Color Key

Quarterfinals
The Quarterfinals began on April 6, 2013, in PAGCOR Grand Theater in Parañaque, Metro Manila. Each week, performances from six acts took place on Saturday nights, while the results are announced during Sunday nights of which two acts — one act chosen through public poll via SMS votes and one chosen by the judges — will proceed to the semifinals. Oftentimes during results nights, guests are invited live to perform.

Quarterfinals summary
Color Key

Week 1 (April 6 & 7)
 Guest performers: Yeng Constantino and Angeline Quinto. Angel Calalas, Freestylers, Rico the Magician, and Happy Feet from PGT season 2

Week 2 (April 13 & 14)
 Guest performers: Gloc-9, Zia Quizon, Abra, Paolo Valenciano, Filogram and B4 from season 2, and Kiriko from season 3

Week 3 (April 20 & 21)
 Guest performers: Iya Villania and Nikki Gil. Ryan Christian Recto made a special birthday tribute to his eldest brother, Luis Manzano, together with Villania and Gil along with Manzano's other non-celebrity friends, Dance Selection from season 2, and Wushu Discovery from season 3

Week 4 (April 27 & 28)
 Guest performers: KZ Tandingan and Jed Madela. Maria Jeline Oliva and Keith Clark Delleva from season 1, and Buildex Pagales from season 2

Week 5 (May 4 & 5)
Ai-Ai delas Alas was not able to attend the fifth week of quarterfinals due to illness. Due to this, Vice Ganda was asked to take her duties, but only as a replacement judge for the week.

 Guest performers: Vice Ganda, NielBeth (Leoniel Enopia and Elizabeth Dazo) from season 2, and Twin Divas from season 3

Week 6 (May 11 & 12)
 Guest performer: Bamboo Mañalac

  The performances of the six remaining acts were held outside of PAGCOR Theater as a bigger space was needed for them to perform.

Semifinals
The Semifinals began on May 18, 2013, in PAGCOR Grand Theater in Parañaque, Metro Manila. For two weeks, six quarterfinalist winners per week will perform for a special spot in the six slots for the finals. The mechanics for the semifinals will be the same from the quarterfinals. However, three acts will be chosen per week, instead of the usual two — one act coming from the public's vote, and two from the judges' votes.

Also just like the quarterfinals, guests will be invited to perform in the show.

Semifinals summary
Color key

Week 7 (May 18 & 19)
 Guest performers: Nikki Gil, Bugoy Cariño (recorded performance), Sam Concepcion, Eric Tai, Kris Lawrence

Week 8 (May 25 & 26) 

  The performance of Lateral Drift Productions was held outside of PAGCOR Theater as a bigger space was needed for them to perform.

Grand Finals
The Grand Finals was held on June 1–2, 2013 in PAGCOR Grand Theater in Parañaque, Metro Manila.

The performance of Lateral Drift Productions was held outside of PAGCOR Theater as a bigger space was needed for them to perform.

Guest performers:
June 1, 2013
 Special performers: El Gamma Penumbra of season 3 performed a shadow theater routine based on Francis Magalona's "Tayo'y Mga Pinoy"

June 2, 2013
 Celebrity performers: Ai-Ai Delas Alas, Jhong Hilario, Streetboys, Zia Quizon, KZ Tandingan, Zsa Zsa Padilla
 Special performers: Seasons 1 to 3 winners Jovit Baldivino, Marcelito Pomoy, Maasinhon Trio

Color key

Criticism
With Roel Manlangit declared as the winner of the fourth season, many Filipino netizens were disappointed with the show for its preference with singers. The show had produced six singers (Baldivino, Pomoy, Maasinhon Trio, and Manlangit himself) for four straight seasons, all of whom were males. Many had vented their disappointments on Twitter. One shared that in order to win the show, one must be a male singer with a very sad and tragic background story. Some netizens also recommended to change the title of the show to "Pilipinas Got Singers," pertaining much to the winning streak of singers in the show.

Television ratings
Television ratings for the fourth season of Pilipinas Got Talent on ABS-CBN are gathered from two major sources, namely from AGB Nielsen and Kantar Media. AGB Nielsen's survey ratings are gathered from Mega Manila households, while Kantar Media's survey ratings are gathered from all over the Philippines' urban and rural households.

Color keys
 Highest rating during the season
 Lowest rating during the season

References

External links
 Official website

Pilipinas Got Talent
2013 Philippine television seasons